Yosiris Urrutia Chaverra (born 26 June 1986) is a Colombian athlete whose specialty is the triple jump. She competed at the 2015 World Championships in Beijing, finishing tenth. She also won the bronze at the 2015 Pan American Games. She represented Colombia at the 2020 Summer Olympics.

Her personal bests are 14.58 metres in the triple jump (+0.7 m/s, Monaco 2014) and 6.53 metres in the long jump (-5.3 m/s, Cali 2010).

Competition record

References

External links

1986 births
Living people
Colombian female triple jumpers
World Athletics Championships athletes for Colombia
Athletes (track and field) at the 2015 Pan American Games
Athletes (track and field) at the 2019 Pan American Games
People from Apartadó
Athletes (track and field) at the 2016 Summer Olympics
Olympic athletes of Colombia
Pan American Games medalists in athletics (track and field)
Pan American Games bronze medalists for Colombia
Central American and Caribbean Games silver medalists for Colombia
Central American and Caribbean Games bronze medalists for Colombia
Competitors at the 2010 Central American and Caribbean Games
Competitors at the 2014 Central American and Caribbean Games
Competitors at the 2018 Central American and Caribbean Games
South American Championships in Athletics winners
Central American and Caribbean Games medalists in athletics
Medalists at the 2015 Pan American Games
Ibero-American Championships in Athletics winners
Athletes (track and field) at the 2020 Summer Olympics
Sportspeople from Antioquia Department
21st-century Colombian women